Louis Eugène Marie Bautain (17 February 179615 October 1867), was a French philosopher and theologian.

Life
Bautain was born at Paris.  At the École Normale he came under the influence of Victor Cousin. In 1816 he adopted the profession of higher teaching, and was soon after called to the chair of philosophy in the University of Strasbourg. He held this position for many years, and gave a parallel course of lectures as professor of the literary faculty in the same city. The reaction against speculative philosophy, which carried away De Maistre and Lamennais, influenced him also.

In 1828 he took orders, and resigned his chair at the university. For several years he remained at Strasbourg, lecturing at the Faculty and at the college of Juilly, but in 1849 he set out for Paris as vicar of the diocese. At Paris he obtained considerable reputation as an orator, and in 1853 was made professor of moral theology at the theological faculty. This post he held till his death.

Like the Scholastics, he distinguished reason and faith, and held that revelation supplies facts, otherwise unattainable, which philosophy is able to group by scientific methods. Theology and philosophy thus form one comprehensive science. Yet Bautain was no rationalist; like Pascal and Newman he exalted faith above reason. He pointed out, following chiefly the Kantian criticism, that reason can never yield knowledge of things in themselves. But there exists in addition to reason another faculty which may be called intelligence, through which we are put in connection with spiritual and invisible truth. This intelligence does not of itself yield a body of truth; it merely contains the germs of the higher ideas, and these are made productive by being brought into contact with revealed facts. This fundamental conception Bautain worked out in the departments of psychology and morals.

Works
The most important of his works are:
Philosophie du Christianisme (1835)
Psychologie expérimentale (1839), new edition entitled Esprit humain et ses facultés (1859)
Philosophie morale (1840)
Religion et liberté (1848)
La morale de l’Évangile, comparée aux divers systèmes de morale (Strassburg, 1827; Paris, 1855)
De l'éducation publique en France au XIX siècle (Paris, 1876).

References

Attribution

Further reading
 Horton, Walter Marshall, Ph.D., The Philosophy of the Abbé Bautain (New York: The New York University Press, 1926).
McCool, Gerald A., Nineteenth-century Scholasticism: The Search for a Unitary Method (New York: Fordham University Press, 1989), 46—58.
Reardon, Bernard, Liberalism and Tradition: Aspects of Catholic Thought in Nineteenth-Century France (Cambridge: Cambridge University Press, 1975), 113—137.

External links

1796 births
1867 deaths
Baillaud, Benjamin
19th-century French philosophers
19th-century French Catholic theologians
French male non-fiction writers
19th-century French male writers